The Crown, also known as Huang Guan Shan and sometimes Crown Peak, is a mountain in the Karakoram mountain range in China. It is located in the Xinjiang Uyghur Autonomous Region of China. About 42 kilometers from Chogori Peak.

A detailed account of the unsuccessful British military summit attempt (1987), was written by Hugh McManners entitled "Crowning the Dragon", published by HarperCollins in 1989 .

The summit was first climbed in 1993 by a Japanese party of the Tōkai branch of the Japanese Alpine Club.

See also
List of highest mountains
List of Ultras of the Western Himalayas

References

Mountains of Xinjiang
Seven-thousanders of the Karakoram